Karen Margrethe Harup Petersen (20 November 1924 – 9 July 2009) was a Danish swimmer. She competed in four events at the 1948 Summer Olympics and won three medals: a gold in the 100 m backstroke and silvers in the 400 m and 4 × 100 m freestyle, placing fourth in the 100 m freestyle.

She won three more gold medals at the 1947 European Championships. During her career she held 30 national titles and set two world records in freestyle relay events. In 1949 she retired from competitions and started a five decades long career of a swimming coach. In 1975 she was inducted into the International Swimming Hall of Fame.

See also
 List of members of the International Swimming Hall of Fame

References

1924 births
2009 deaths
People from Gentofte Municipality
Danish female backstroke swimmers
Danish female freestyle swimmers
Danish female swimmers
Olympic swimmers of Denmark
Swimmers at the 1948 Summer Olympics
Olympic gold medalists for Denmark
Olympic silver medalists for Denmark
European Aquatics Championships medalists in swimming
Medalists at the 1948 Summer Olympics
Olympic gold medalists in swimming
Olympic silver medalists in swimming
Sportspeople from the Capital Region of Denmark